Ellen M. Lord is an American businesswoman and government official who previously served as the Under Secretary of Defense for Acquisition and Sustainment in the Trump administration. She was previously the CEO of Textron Systems, a global aerospace, defense, security, and advanced technologies industrial conglomerate. In her position, she was the chief weapons purchaser for the United States, responsible for overseeing hundreds of billions of dollars of weapons and services acquisitions programs in the United States Department of Defense.

Lord served as vice chairwoman of the National Defense Industrial Association and as a member of the Center for a New American Security's task force on strategy, technology, and the global defense industry. She was also a board member of the Defense Technology Initiative, the Naval Institute Foundation, and the U.S.-India Business Council.

Lord left the Pentagon in January 2021, after which she joined the consultancy firm the Chertoff Group as a senior advisor, Johns Hopkins University Applied Physics Lab as a senior fellow, military contractor AAR as a director, Voyager Space as a director, Clarifai, an artificial-intelligence corporation, as a senior advisor, military contractor SAIC as a strategic advisor, and the electro-optical/infrared corporation GEOST as a director.

References

External links
 
 Biography at the Department of Defense

Living people
Trump administration personnel
United States Under Secretaries of Defense
21st-century American businesspeople
American women in politics
University of New Hampshire alumni
Connecticut College alumni
Year of birth missing (living people)
21st-century American businesswomen